Colton Chase Moore (born October 10, 1993) is an American politician who represented Georgia's 1st House District in the Georgia State House Representative from January 14, 2019, to January 14, 2021. At 24 years old, he is the youngest elected official ever from Dade County, Georgia.

Personal life

Early life and education 
Moore was born and raised on his family farm in Dade County, Georgia, where he resides today. 
 As a child, Moore said he "idolized Teddy Roosevelt, seeing him as a figure who acted quickly and boldly". Moore was the State President of Georgia Future Business Leaders of America under Executive Director Monty Rhodes from March 2011 to March 2012. During that time he led more than 25,000 students and 320 advisers.

At age 18, Moore became a commercial truck driver, and started auctioneering while studying at the University of Georgia. In 2016, Moore graduated from the University of Georgia with a double bachelors in political science and international affairs.

Auctioneering 
Since graduating college, Moore runs his family's bulldozing and trucking business, and is an internationally acclaimed auctioneer, having traveled over 75,000 miles. In 2016, Moore was the Georgia Auctioneering Champion. In 2017 Moore was a top 20 finalist in the International Auctioneering Championship.

Political career

Georgia House of Representatives campaign and election 
Only nineteen months after graduating college, twenty four-year old Moore qualified to run against incumbent John Deffenbaugh in the House race for District One. Moore's budget was just $3,500 and completely self funded, which was but a tenth of Deffenbaugh's campaign spending.
 With no declared Democratic opponent, Republican Moore was elected as the presumptive District 1 State Representative on May 22, 2018, after defeating John Deffenbaugh by a margin of 326 votes with a final tally of 2,184 to 1,858.

Policy and legislation 
Rated by American Conservative Union as the seventh most conservative legislator in Georgia, Moore ardently supports conservative issues. He has supported and cosigned multiple bills such as HB 2 (co-signed), which defends constitutional carry in Georgia; HB 481 (co-signed), the "Heartbeat Bill"; is a strong supporter of 10-year term limits; advocates for the end of film subsidies which costs Georgians exorbitant funds every year; and supports HB 179, "which would allow school teachers and administrators to utilize discipline in schools without having it negatively impact their school’s climate ratings".

On September 23, 2018, Representative-Elect Colton Moore sent a publicized letter to Dan Cathy, CEO of Chick-fil-A, to consider several locations throughout Dade County for new Chick-fil-A restaurants. The letter also suggested Chick-fil-A should consider Exit 169 off Interstate 24, which receives nearly 70,000 cars per day, as Chick-fil-A's first truckstop restaurant.

Support for Governor Brian Kemp 
Moore has supported now Governor Brian Kemp from the beginning of his run, being the first representative- elect to endorse him. On October 15, 2018, Rep-Elect Moore acquired the domain name BrianKemp.com, in reference to Georgia's current Secretary of State and 2018 Republican gubernatorial nominee, Brian Kemp. Previously, BrianKemp.com had been redirected to Democratic opponent Stacey Abrams' website, which caused confusion for those looking for Brian Kemp's official website. Moore and friend, Michael Gargiulo, a domain-name expert, "brokered a five-figure name transaction to buy the rights to the site". Moore used personal money. As of October 15, 2018 BrianKemp.com now displays accurate links and information about how Colton Moore acquired the URL. In November 2018, Moore unofficially campaigned for Kemp. Moore drove a truck that was covered in signs, urging people from Catoosa, Walker and Dade to vote for Kemp. Kemp thanked Moore on social media multiple times, saying that the "Big Trucks for Kemp Coalition is working hard!” and "Big thanks to State Representative Colton Moore for working to Get Out The Vote in Northwest Georgia with his 'Big Trucks for Kemp' dump truck!”

Support for President Donald Trump 
Moore has also been a strong supporter of President Donald Trump since the beginning of Trump's campaign in 2015. In 2018, Moore was responsible for bringing a Trump rally to Chattanooga. Moore extended an "official invitation" to the president, and in November 2018, President Trump and Vice President Pence visited Northwest Georgia and Chattanooga, Tennessee. Multiple times, Moore has spoken out against those that demean and attack those wearing MAGA hats, condemning the division it creates.

House Resolution 328 
Moore has a history of opposing cronyism and unethical behavior in the Georgia Legislature. In 2019, Moore was among ten representatives that signed House Resolution 328, calling for Georgia House Speaker David Ralston to resign due to his abuse of power and unethical behavior. Ralston leveraged his position as Speaker of the House to postpone his cases more than 900 times, helping criminals stay out of prison. Among Ralston's clients were molesters, rapists, and individuals that have committed a violent crime, who confessed that they retained Ralston as their attorney because he could leverage his position in their favor to indefinitely postpone cases.  David Shell, a man who has beaten many women, including having been charged by a grand jury as a repeat offender, told the Atlanta Journal-Constitution: "That’s why I gave him 20,000 bucks… He’s worth every penny of it". Moore wrote a letter to Speaker Ralston that read,  "While legislative continuance is a right all legislators have access to, your use of this right has resulted in an unjust delay of violent criminal cases in our state… District 1 and many citizens across our great state believe you should no longer serve as the leader of Georgia's largest governing body".

Criminal Justice Reform 
In February 2019, Moore was one of two dissenting votes against naming the judicial complex after Nathan Deal. Moore, a big advocate for prison reform, said that it was not right for Deal to be "the symbol of justice in Georgia", as his reforms were insufficient. Moore said: "Georgians all across our state are feeling injustices as they enter into the criminal justice system", Moore continued, "So I don’t think we should just automatically name the most expensive building in the state of Georgia, at $110 million, after someone just because they were the former governor and just because they were forced to take on criminal reforms… In order to help the poor, the broke and the damned in our society, we’ve got to focus on those issues and not just create big government". Moore continued to write a memorandum to Governor Kemp, listing the reasons why it would be an inappropriate choice to name the new judicial center after Governor Deal. "Respectfully, such a designation would be highly inappropriate for a building where the Georgia Supreme Court and Court of Appeals will be housed. Former Governor Deal continues to be extremely active in Georgia politics. He owns and operates a lobbying firm which already represents clients, such as Pruitt Health, that have significant cases before the state Appellate courts on matters ranging from wrongful death to fraud against state agencies. Should you approve HR1, these clients and their critical court cases will be heard in the very building named after the lobbying firm they have hired. This is a serious conflict of interest that eternally jeopardizes the crown jewel of justice in Georgia".

Georgia Future Caucus 
In 2020, Moore became the co- chair of the Georgia branch of the Future Caucus, a bipartisan organization that educates on legislative issues that future generations will face. Moore co-chairs alongside Representative Jasmine Clark.

Georgia State Senate campaign 
In March 2020, Moore told the press that he would not be running for reelection for his house seat. "After weeks of careful thought and prayers, I will not be seeking reelection to the Georgia House of Representatives for the 2021-2022 term". Moore concluded, "elected office is a heavy burden, but a great honor… Freedom and liberty are not free, the price must be paid for every generation". In a shocking turn of events, Moore qualified to run for the State Senate seat for District 53 against Jeff Mullis. Moore explained, "I'm going up against the political boss of Northwest Georgia… Against all odds". Moore said that Jeff Mullis "has tried to 'push me out of my seat".’ Consistent with his history of fighting cronyism, Moore explained that part of his motivation for running against Mullis was seeing Mullis’s mistreatment of those that do not agree with him. "We have this powerful chairman with all the influence, but if you disagree with him, you don't have any influence". Moore is at a financial disadvantage; Moore has $26, while Mullis has $250,000. Moore explained that "That's money and influence from Atlanta," and is not a representation of support from the district.

In April 2020, Moore asked Senator Jeff Mullis to debate him in Dade County, and Mullis refused. Moore wrote to Mullis, "Since 2018, we have both represented over 50,000 constituents in Northwest Georgia however, our leadership styles, ideas, and problem-solving abilities could not be more different. The time has come to show the people the differences of all candidates in a formal debate, as citizens deserve when voting for their next State Senator on June 9, 2020… I hope we can agree the people of Georgia deserve openness and transparency as they vote for their next State Senator. There is no better method to deliver this than open debate."

Endorsements 
In April 2020, Ringgold Mayor Nick Millwood announced that he endorses Moore instead of incumbent Jeff Mullis. Mayor Millwood cited standing up against unethical politics and legislators; empowering educators; not compromisingly defending constitutional carry and the second amendment, and standing up for first amendment rights as among the many reasons that he strongly endorses Moore. Mayor Millwood said: "During Colton’s term as a state representative, his frustrations at being blocked and talked down to by Jeff Mullis led him to tackle the problem directly and run for that seat.  I admire his tenacity and ability to go right to the source of the problem and launch a public challenge to make a difference". Moore has also been endorsed by Young Americans for Liberty, among others.

References

External links 
 Colton Moore at ballotpedia.org

People from Dade County, Georgia
University of Georgia alumni
American auctioneers
Southern Baptists
Baptists from Georgia (U.S. state)
21st-century American politicians
Conservative Party of Georgia politicians
Republican Party members of the Georgia House of Representatives
People from Chattanooga, Tennessee
Living people
1993 births
Baptists from Tennessee